Datuk Seri Shamsul Iskandar @ Yusre bin Mohd. Akin (Jawi: شمس الإسكندر @ يسري بن محمد عقين; born 29 December 1974) is a Malaysian politician who has served as Senior Political Secretary to Prime Minister Anwar Ibrahim since December 2022. He served as the Deputy Minister of Primary Industries in the Pakatan Harapan (PH) administration under former Prime Minister Mahathir Mohamad and former Minister Teresa Kok Suh Sim from July 2018 to the collapse of the PH administration in February 2020 and the Member of Parliament (MP) for Hang Tuah Jaya from May 2018 to November 2022 and for Bukit Katil from May 2013 to May 2018. He is a member and was Information Chief, Spokesperson as well as Vice-President of the People's Justice Party (PKR), a component party of the PH coalition.

Background
Shamsul Iskandar is married with three children. For his primary education, he went to Sekolah Kebangsaan Kesang Tua. He received his secondary education at Sekolah Menengah Kebangsaan Agama Sultan Muhammad, Melaka before later finished his Upper Secondary at Sultan Alam Shah Islamic College (KISAS). He obtained his law degree in International Islamic University Malaysia.

He is a King Scout.

In university, he was the President of the ASEAN Law Students Association (ALSA) and also the Pro-tem Chairman of Malaysian Law Students Association (MALSA).

Political career
In 2007, he became the Chief of PKR's youth wing after the leader, Mohamad Ezam Mohd Nor, left the post in 2006, and he defeated Hasmi Hashim in the 2007 election to replace him.

In 2004 election, he contested the newly created Tangga Batu parliamentary constituency in his home state, Malacca but lost to Idris Haron. Then in the 2008 election, he contested and lost the Dungun parliamentary seat in Terengganu. He was finally elected to federal Parliament in the 2013 election for the seat of Bukit Katil, defeating heavyweight opponent, the Chief Minister of Melaka, Mohd Ali Rustam.  In the 2018 election, he managed to retain his Bukit Katil which had change to Hang Tuah Jaya after the 2018 re-delineation but lost the Rim seat of the Malacca State Legislative Assembly.

In 2014 he was elected a vice-president of PKR, alongside Rafizi Ramli, Nurul Izzah Anwar and Tian Chua. He did not re-contest the leadership of PKR's youth wing.

On December 11, 2013 Shamsul Iskandar was charged with being responsible for Malaysia's Post General Election rally 2013 or "Blackout 505", a rally that was held in a restricted area at the compound of University of Malaysia's Ar-Rahman Mosque which happened across 15 cities in Malaysia. After five years he was acquitted on May 16, 2018 and all charges were dropped on grounds that prosecutor failed to prove the case against Shamsul beyond reasonable doubt.

Following the victory of Pakatan Harapan in 14th General Election, he was appointed as the Member of Cabinet assuming the role of Deputy Minister of Primary Industries under the new government led by Prime Minister, Tun Dr Mahathir Mohamad.

At the international level, Shamsul Iskandar is also a Board Member of The Parliamentary Network on the World Bank & International Monetary Fund.

In the upcoming 15th General Election, Shamsul Iskandar had expressed his interest to challenge Ahmad Zahid Hamidi for the Bagan Datuk parliamentary seat.

Election results

Honours

Honours of Malaysia
  :
  Grand Commander of the Exalted Order of Malacca (DGSM) - Datuk Seri (2018)

See also
Tangga Batu (federal constituency)
Dungun (federal constituency)
Bukit Katil (federal constituency)

References

External links
 

1974 births
Living people
People from Malacca
Malaysian people of Malay descent
Malaysian Muslims
20th-century Malaysian lawyers
People's Justice Party (Malaysia) politicians
Members of the Dewan Rakyat
International Islamic University Malaysia alumni
21st-century Malaysian politicians